The Grammy Award for Best Improvised Jazz Solo has been awarded since 1959. Before 1979 the award title did not specify instrumental performances and was presented for instrumental or vocal performances.  The award has had several minor name changes:

 In 1959 the award was known as Best Jazz Performance, Individual
 In 1960 it was awarded as Best Jazz Performance - Soloist
 From 1961 to 1971 the award was combined with the Grammy Award for Best Jazz Instrumental Album, Individual or Group
 From 1972 to 1978 it was awarded as Best Jazz Performance by a Soloist
 From 1979 to 1988 it was awarded as Best Jazz Instrumental Performance, Soloist
 From 1989 to 1990 it was awarded as Best Jazz Instrumental Performance Soloist (on a jazz recording)
 In 1991 it was awarded as Best Jazz Instrumental Performance, Soloist
 From 1992 to 2008 it was awarded as Best Jazz Instrumental Solo
 Since 2009 it has been awarded as Best Improvised Jazz Solo

Recipients

References

Grammy Awards for jazz
Jazz Instrumental Solo